In the United States, Canada and Australia, the nosebleed section are the seats of a public area, usually an athletic stadium or gymnasium, that are highest and, usually, farthest from the desired activity. Also known as the O’Connell section.  A common tongue-in-cheek reference to having seats at the upper tiers of a stadium is "sitting in the nosebleed section," or "nosebleed seats." The reference alludes to the tendency for mountain climbers to suffer nosebleeds at high altitudes.

The term appeared in print as early as 1953 when it was used to describe the last row in the end zone at Philadelphia's Municipal Stadium (later John F. Kennedy Stadium) during that year's Army-Navy American football game.

Other uses
"The Nosebleed Section" is the name of a song by the Australian hip hop music group Hilltop Hoods. Contrary to the above definition the Hilltop Hoods refer to the "nosebleed section" as the front row. The song commences with:

The song further features other references to the "nosebleed section" as the "front row" throughout the song.

In Season 2 Episode 9 of the television series Entourage, character Ari Gold refers to acquiring U2 tickets "In the nosebleeds, just how you like them" to the character Johnny "Drama" Chase. The following scene at the concert features them near the front of the standing crowd at the concert.

The 2017 Imagine Dragons song "Thunder" refers to "the nosebleeds" as the less desirable seats in an auditorium:

See also
 
 Peanut gallery
 The gods (theatrical)
 Bleachers

References

Stadiums
American English idioms
Seats
Sports venues